New Start may refer to:

 New START, a 2010 nuclear arms treaty between Russia and the USA
 New Start (Fastlane album), 2005
 New Start (The Nadas album), 1997
 New Start (Hungary), a political party in Hungary